Capitan is a village in Lincoln County, New Mexico, United States, located north of the Lincoln National Forest between the Capitan and Sacramento Mountains at an elevation of 6,350 feet (1,950 m). The population was 1,489 at the 2010 census. Capitan was founded in the 1890s and incorporated in 1941.

Geography
According to the United States Census Bureau, Capitan has a total area of 3.2 square miles (8.3 km2), all land. The community is surrounded by high desert mountains and New Mexico cedar, pinon and juniper trees.

Climate

Demographics

As of the census of 2000, there were 1,443 people, 605 households, and 416 families residing in the village. The population density was 450.9 people per square mile (174.1/km2). There were 717 housing units at an average density of 224.0 per square mile (86.5/km2). The racial makeup of the village was 87.53% White, 0.55% African American, 1.46% Native American, 0.55% Asian, 0.07% Pacific Islander, 7.76% from other races, and 2.08% from two or more races. Hispanic or Latino of any race were 19.20% of the population.

There were 605 households, out of which 26.4% had children under the age of 18 living with them, 56.0% were married couples living together, 9.8% had a female householder with no husband present, and 31.2% were non-families. 27.4% of all households were made up of individuals, and 10.4% had someone living alone who was 65 years of age or older. The average household size was 2.39 and the average family size was 2.91.

In the village, the population was spread out, with 24.9% under the age of 18, 5.9% from 18 to 24, 22.6% from 25 to 44, 29.9% from 45 to 64, and 16.6% who were 65 years of age or older. The median age was 42 years. For every 100 females, there were 97.4 males. For every 100 females age 18 and over, there were 93.4 males.

The median income for a household in the village was $27,188, and the median income for a family was $32,115. Males had a median income of $23,500 versus $16,902 for females. The per capita income for the village was $15,062. About 8.3% of families and 13.0% of the population were below the poverty line, including 13.7% of those under age 18 and 12.1% of those age 65 or over.

Transportation
Major Highways
 U.S. Route 380
 NM 48
 NM 246

Smokey Bear

In spring of 1950, a badly burned black bear cub was rescued from a large forest fire at Capitan Gap in the Capitan Mountains. First called Hotfoot Teddy, he was later renamed Smokey and became the real-life version of the United States Forest Service mascot Smokey Bear. Smokey was later sent to the National Zoo in Washington D.C., where he lived for 26 years. Upon his death on November 9, 1976, Smokey's remains were returned by the government to Capitan and buried at what is now the Smokey Bear Historical Park.

Notable people
Capitan is the home of rancher and businessman Edward R. Tinsley, III, owner of the K-Bob's Steakhouse restaurant chain. He was also the unsuccessful Republican nominee in 2008 for the 2nd congressional district seat vacated by Steve Pearce, who ran unsuccessfully for the United States Senate.

References

External links

 Village website
 Chamber of Commerce

Villages in Lincoln County, New Mexico
Villages in New Mexico